No. 95 Squadron was a squadron of the RFC and RAF.

History

First world war
The squadron was formed as part of the Royal Flying Corps on 8 October 1917 at Ternhill, Shropshire out of No. 43 Training Squadron using a variety of aircraft. On 30 October 1917 the squadron moved to Shotwick near Chester. The squadron was intended to move to France in April 1918 using the Sopwith Camel, the intended aircraft were later changed to Sopwith Dolphins but with delays it remained at Shotwick in the training role. Other attempts were made to get aircraft and prepare for a move to France but the squadron was disbanded on 4 July 1918 without ever getting its own aircraft.

Second World War
The squadron was re-formed at RAF Pembroke Dock on 16 January 1941 from part of 210 Squadron, initially with three Short Sunderland flying boats.  
Moved to Freetown, Sierra Leone, on 17 March 1941 
Moved to Gambia in March 1943, with detachments to Sierra Leone, Dakar and Liberia 
Disbanded on 30 June 1945

References

External links

095
095
Military history of the Gambia